Liège is a parliamentary constituency in Belgium used to elect members of the Parliament of Wallonia since 1995. It corresponds to the Arrondissement of Liège.

Representatives

References

Constituencies of the Parliament of Wallonia